Denis Aleksandrovich Bakurskiy (born 19 March 1981) is a former Russian professional football player.

Club career
He played in the Russian Football National League for FC Sokol Saratov in 2005.

External links
 

1981 births
Sportspeople from Saratov
Living people
Russian footballers
Association football defenders
FC Zhemchuzhina Sochi players
FC Sokol Saratov players
FC Taganrog players
FC Spartak-2 Moscow players